"Think About It" is a song by English singer Melanie C from her fifth studio album, The Sea. It was released on 4 September 2011 as worldwide lead single from the album and the general second single – "Rock Me" was released only in Germany. It was written by Adam Argyle and collaborative team Cutfather. The track was recorded in Copenhagen and was released after the buzz single "Rock Me", prior to the release Melanie had spent time on the West-End Blood Brothers which she said helped her develop and evolve as an artist.

The song is a dance-pop song that also fuses the usual rock-stance Melanie had taken in her career since 1999. Lyrically the song discusses doing something that you know you shouldn't.

The song gathered critical acclaim, and critics considered it a welcome change, seen as a better release than the previous, "Rock Me". Critics enjoyed her new-found pop style and found it to be a good introduction to her fifth studio album The Sea. Commercially the song was a moderate hit: in Austria, Switzerland and Germany with its highest peak being in the Swiss charts at number 30. A music video directed Howard Greenhalgh showed her perform against different backdrops and in different outfits throughout. Melanie C performed this on The Sea – Live tour.

The single peaked at number 6 on the Billboard Dance Singles Chart.

Background
Melanie C was one fifth of the girl-band Spice Girls and has been releasing solo material since 1999, her previous studio album entitled This Time was released four years prior to the release of "Think About It". In the time she spent between records by her own record label named Red Girl Records, Melanie completed a stint performing in the West End, in the musical Blood Brothers and also became a mother. It was after this time that she started work on her fifth studio album, with the experience from "singing regularly over 6 months" left her confident and strengthened as a vocalist, and left her more confident in the songwriting area also. Melanie spent time recording worldwide and after a track from these sessions titled "Rock Me" was released as a part of the German TV channel's coverage of the FIFA Women's World Cup. Soon after, she announced the release of the lead single from The Sea titled "Think About It".

Development

Melanie C's own independent record label announced the track on her official website stating the track was written in Copenhagen with producers Adam Argyle and  the Cutfather team, and saying "We are incredibly excited to announce Melanie's brand new single – 'Think About It'. Taken from the forthcoming album 'The Sea', the track was written in Copenhagen with Adam Argyle and new collaborators the Cutfather team – who also produced the song. The single is a fresh sound for Melanie; an elevating chorus and enriching melody, basked in light and colour is perfect for the summer." When writing a Question and Answer session on her official website for the single "Rock Me", she was asked about the producer of "Think About It" Adam Argyle to which she responded;
"My good buddy Adam Argyle features heavily on the album. He's such a brilliant songwriter and I think we're a good team. We collaborated with some fantastic new people too like Jodie Marr. She is incredible and one of my favourite songs came from that session. Another great song came from a session with Adam & Martin Brammer. We took a trip over to Copenhagen and worked with Cutfather, which was some of the best few days working on this album with great results."

Composition
"Think About It" sees Melanie move away from her more rock-influenced sound that she had spent time crafting in years prior. Incorporating "a more electronic and layered production style", the song has been described as a "summer track", with an "infectious melody". The single has been compared to some of the music featured on her debut solo album titled Northern Star, whilst being described as a "poppier dance feel", it has elements of dance-music. Lyrically the song discusses doing something "you know you shouldn't", with lyrics stating "you only regret what you don't do". Lewis Corner from Digital Spy described the track as a "Cutfather-helmed combination of modish guitar riffs and pulsating house beats" and called the song a mix between the bubblegum-pop themes of artist Katy Perry and power-anthem themes by artist Kelly Clarkson. With the lyrics "If there's a chance we'll break, I want to smash into pieces", Corner claimed that the track falls under a "Euro-friendly" category. DJ Ron Slomowicz of About.com described the track as a "fast-paced pop rock track" and compared the song further to, Kelly Clarkson but noted it had similarities to tracks by Avril Lavigne but stated it "most closely resembles "Raise Your Glass" by P!nk".

Critical reception
Pip Ellwood of Entertainment Focus felt that it is "Melanie's strongest single release for some time", Ellwood positively described the recent "pop influences" within the track, and found that she has "let her hair down" with the track, and concluded the review noting "It has certainly peaked our interest in Melanie's new album The Sea." Lewis Corner of Digital Spy also gave a positive review starting his response with "When whispers of a pop comeback for Melanie C first surfaced last year, we'll readily admit that we were intrigued" and felt that the track was an appropriate "trailer" for the album. DJ Ron Slomowicz of About.com listed the song as a "Song of the Day" calling it a comeback he stated "It works incredibly well in Mel's favor, giving her one of her strongest singles since her debut album.  If you aren't tapping your foot, bopping your head, humming along, or going crazy, then maybe you're thinking too much." Slomowicz called it an expectation of what is to come on her The Sea record and claimed it showcases "not only modern product" but the "beauty of Melanie's voice". A writer for Popjustice expressed disappointment with the previous single "Rock Me", and called Melanie's comeback "probably one of pop's least necessary", however Popjustice concluded there response with "As it turns out, if you're able to somehow hear past Mel's sometimes rather alarming vocals, 'Think About It' is precisely four types of brilliant" and listed the track as "Song of the Day".

Commercial performance
The single peaked at number 6 on the Official US Billboard charts.
In Austria, the single spent two weeks on the chart, and peaked at number 34, similarly in Switzerland the song spent two weeks on the chart but peaked at number 32. In Germany the single spent four weeks on the chart peaking at number 48 whilst in the United Kingdom the single peaked at number 15 on the Indie charts.

Music video

A music video for "Think About It" was released, directed by Howard Greenhalgh, her official website described it saying it "provides the song with a varied canvas – bursts of vivid colour and imagery – that's if you can try and take your eyes off Melanie in a selection of stunning outfits!" The video premiered on 15 July 2011 and starts showing Melanie lip-synch the track with an ever-changing backdrop, that shows different colors and imagery. After the first chorus, Melanie's outfits then start to change and the video consistently shows shots of different outfits and backgrounds including one showing fireworks and another showing glitter. During the final scenes, Melanie is shown to be pulling a sheet of black material which she then dancers in front of, and another shot shows Melanie removing items of clothing.

Formats and track listings
These are the formats and track listings of major single releases of "Think About It".

Limited Edition 4 Track CD single (Red Girl)
"Think About It"
"Cruel Intentions"
"Rock Me" 
"Rock Me" 

Digital 4 track EP (Red Girl)
"Think About It"
"Cruel Intentions"
"Think About It" 
"Think About It" 

Digital 4 Track Remix Bundle (Red Girl)
"Think About It" 
"Think About It" 
"Think About It" 
"Think About It" 

2 Track CD single (Warner Music)
"Think About It"
"Cruel Intentions"

Digital 4 Track EP (Warner Music)
"Think About It"
"Cruel Intentions"
"Think About It" 
"Think About It"

Charts

Release history

References

2011 singles
2011 songs
Melanie C songs
Songs written by Adam Argyle
Songs written by Cutfather
Songs written by Daniel Davidsen
Songs written by Jason Gill (musician)
Songs written by Melanie C
Music videos directed by Howard Greenhalgh